Patrick Lavon Mahomes II (born September 17, 1995) is an American football quarterback for the Kansas City Chiefs of the National Football League (NFL). The son of former Major League Baseball (MLB) pitcher Pat Mahomes, he initially played college football and baseball at Texas Tech University. Following his sophomore year, he quit baseball to focus solely on football. In his junior year, he led all NCAA Division I FBS players in multiple categories including passing yards (5,052) and total touchdowns (53). He was selected 10th overall by the Kansas City Chiefs in the 2017 NFL Draft.

Mahomes spent his rookie season as the backup to Alex Smith. He was named the starter in 2018 after the Chiefs traded Smith to the Washington Redskins. That season, Mahomes threw for 5,097 yards, 50 touchdowns, and 12 interceptions. He became the only quarterback in history to throw for more than 5,000 yards in a single season in both college and in the NFL. He joined Peyton Manning as the only players in NFL history to throw for 5,000 yards and 50 passing touchdowns in the same season. For his performance in his first season as starter, he was named to the Pro Bowl, named First Team All-Pro, and won the NFL Offensive Player of the Year and NFL Most Valuable Player awards. Mahomes is one of four black quarterbacks to win the AP MVP award.

In the 2019 season, Mahomes led the Chiefs to Super Bowl LIV, their first Super Bowl appearance in 50 years, where they defeated the San Francisco 49ers. Mahomes was awarded the Super Bowl MVP for his performance, the second black quarterback and youngest overall to do so. He is also the third African American quarterback to win a Super Bowl. In 2020, Mahomes signed a 10-year contract extension worth $477 million with another $26 million in potential bonuses, for a total of $503 million, making it the third-largest known contract in sporting history. The year after signing his contract, he would lead the Chiefs to their second consecutive Super Bowl. In the 2022 season, Mahomes won his second career NFL MVP and his second Super Bowl MVP in Super Bowl LVII over the Philadelphia Eagles, becoming the first player to win NFL MVP and Super Bowl MVP in the same year since Kurt Warner in 1999, along with joining Tom Brady and Joe Montana as the only quarterbacks to win multiple regular season and Super Bowl MVPs.

Since becoming the Chiefs' starting quarterback, Mahomes has led the team to five consecutive AFC Championship Game appearances from the 2018 season through the 2022 season, which is tied for second place with Ken Stabler for the most consecutive conference championship game appearances by a quarterback. Mahomes' career accolades through six seasons in the NFL have earned him widespread praise from sports journalists and many consider Mahomes to be one of the greatest quarterbacks in NFL history.

Early life
Mahomes was born on September 17, 1995, in Tyler, Texas, to Pat Mahomes, an MLB pitcher at the time, and Randi Martin. He attended Whitehouse High School in Whitehouse, Texas. He played football, baseball, and basketball. Mahomes believes that training in pitching and playing basketball improved his quarterback skills. In football, he had 4,619 passing yards, 50 passing touchdowns, 948 rushing yards, and 15 rushing touchdowns as a senior in high school. In baseball, he threw a no-hitter with 16 strikeouts in a game his senior year. He was named the Maxpreps Male Athlete of the Year for 2013–2014.

Mahomes was rated by Rivals.com as a three-star football recruit and was ranked as the 12th best dual-threat quarterback in his class. He received offers from Texas Tech, Rice, and Houston. He committed to Texas Tech University. Mahomes was also a top prospect for the 2014 Major League Baseball draft, but was not expected to be selected high due to his commitment to Texas Tech. He was selected by the Detroit Tigers in the 37th round of the 2014 MLB Draft, but did not sign a contract.

College career

Freshman
Mahomes entered his freshman season at Texas Tech as a backup to Davis Webb. He saw his first career action against Oklahoma State after Webb left the game with an injury, completing two of five passes for 20 yards for one touchdown and an interception. After Webb was again injured, Mahomes started his first career game against Texas. He completed 13 of 21 passes for 109 yards in the game. Mahomes remained the starter for the season's final three games. Against Baylor, he threw for a Big 12 freshman record 598 yards with six touchdowns and one interception. For the season, he passed for 1,547 yards and 16 touchdowns with four interceptions.

Mahomes split time with the Texas Tech baseball team, where he was a relief pitcher.

Sophomore
Mahomes began his sophomore season at Texas Tech as the starting quarterback. Mahomes helped lead the Red Raiders to a 7–6 season with numerous productive outings throughout the season. He recorded ten games going over 350 passing yards, including four games going over 400. He passed for at least three touchdowns in eight of the games, including a five-touchdown performance against Iowa State on October 10. Overall, in the 2015 season, he led the Big 12 Conference with 364 pass completions on 573 attempts for 4,653 yards, 36 touchdowns, and 15 interceptions.

Mahomes appeared in three games as a baseball player, recording no hits in two at bats, and three runs allowed, as a pitcher.

Junior
Prior to the start of the 2016 season, Mahomes announced that he was leaving baseball to focus on football.

Mahomes had a very productive junior season. In the month of September alone, Mahomes passed for 18 touchdowns to three interceptions while rushing for four touchdowns. He averaged 442.5 passing yards per game that month, which included a 540-yard game against Arizona State in the Red Raiders' second game. Mahomes started the month of October with 504 passing yards, two passing touchdowns, and three rushing touchdowns in a losing effort to Kansas State. On October 22, Mahomes set multiple NCAA, Big 12, and school records in a 66–59 loss to Oklahoma at home. Mahomes broke the NCAA FBS records for single-game total offense with 819 yards. He tied the NCAA record for single game passing yards with 734. He fell one short of the record for most attempts at 88. Overall, the game set NCAA records for most combined yards of total offense with 1,708 combined passing yards, and total offense by two players (the other was Oklahoma quarterback Baker Mayfield). The 125 combined points are the second most all time involving ranked teams. Following the Oklahoma game, the Red Raiders defeated TCU before dropping three consecutive games to finish outside bowl eligibility with a 5–7 record. In his final game with Texas Tech, Mahomes finished with 586 passing yards and six touchdowns in a 54–35 victory over Baylor.

Mahomes finished the season leading the country in yards per game (421), passing yards (5,052), total offense (5,312), points responsible for (318), and total touchdowns (53). For his performance, he was awarded the Sammy Baugh Trophy, given annually to the nation's top college passer, joining head coach Kliff Kingsbury, Graham Harrell, and B. J. Symons as other Red Raiders to have won the award. He was named an Academic All-America second team by the College Sports Information Directors of America.

Mahomes announced on January 3, 2017, that he would forgo his last year of college eligibility and enter the NFL Draft.

NCAA Division I FBS records
 Single-game yards passing: 734 (tied) (vs. Oklahoma on October 22, 2016)
 Single-game Yards total offense: 819 (vs. Oklahoma on October 22, 2016)

College statistics

Professional career

NFL draft
Mahomes was projected to be a first or second round pick by the majority of analysts and scouts. During the throwing drills at the NFL Scouting Combine, his passes were clocked at 60 mph, tying Logan Thomas and Bryan Bennett for the fastest pass ever recorded there. Mahomes was ranked second best quarterback by SI.com, third by ESPN, and fourth by NFLDraftScout.com. Representatives from 28 NFL teams attended his pro day at Texas Tech. He became one of the fastest rising prospects during the draft process and had 18 private workouts and official team visits, the most for any prospect in 2017. Among the coaches that he had workouts and visits with were the Arizona Cardinals head coach Bruce Arians, New Orleans Saints head coach Sean Payton, Cincinnati Bengals quarterbacks coach Bill Lazor, and coaches from the Los Angeles Chargers, Cleveland Browns, Chicago Bears, and Pittsburgh Steelers.

The Kansas City Chiefs selected Mahomes in the first round (10th overall) in the 2017 NFL Draft. The Chiefs, originally slated to have the 27th overall selection, traded up in the draft with the Buffalo Bills for the 10th overall selection. The Chiefs traded their first round pick and a third round pick in 2017, and the Chiefs' first round pick in the 2018 NFL Draft for the selection. He was the first quarterback selected by the Chiefs in the first round since selecting Todd Blackledge seventh overall in the 1983 NFL Draft.

2017 season

On July 20, 2017, the Chiefs signed Mahomes to a guaranteed four-year, $16.42 million contract that included a signing bonus of $10.08 million.

The Chiefs announced on December 27, 2017, that with a playoff spot and the fourth seed in the playoffs secured, they would rest starter Alex Smith and give Mahomes his first career start in their week 17 game against the Denver Broncos. Mahomes played most of the game and helped lead the Chiefs to a 27–24 win, completing 22 of 35 passes for 284 yards with one interception.

2018 season

On January 30, 2018, the Chiefs announced they had agreed to trade Smith to the Washington Redskins, elevating Mahomes as starting quarterback. In his first game as the Chiefs starting quarterback, the Chiefs beat the division rival Los Angeles Chargers by a score of 38–28. Mahomes threw for 256 yards and four touchdowns with no interceptions and a 127.5 passer rating and was named AFC Offensive Player of the Week. His first career touchdown came on a 58-yard pass to wide receiver Tyreek Hill in the first quarter.

The following week, Mahomes threw for 326 yards, six touchdowns, no interceptions, and a passer rating of 154.8. After throwing his fifth touchdown in the game, he broke the NFL record for most touchdown passes in a quarterback's first three career games. His sixth touchdown pass broke the NFL record for touchdown passes in a season's first two weeks. For his performance against the Pittsburgh Steelers, Mahomes won his second consecutive AFC Offensive Player of the Week award, the first quarterback since Tom Brady in 2011 to start the season with back-to-back player of the week awards. Mahomes was named AFC Offensive Player of the Month for September.

In week 4, against the Denver Broncos on Monday Night Football, he passed for 304 yards and a touchdown and had one rushing touchdown in the 27–23 comeback victory. In week 6, against the New England Patriots, he passed for 352 yards, four touchdowns, and two interceptions in a 43–40 loss on Sunday Night Football. In the following game, Mahomes and the Chiefs bounced back with a 45–10 victory over the Cincinnati Bengals. In the victory, he passed for 358 yards, four touchdowns, and one interception. In the next game, a 30–23 win over the Denver Broncos, Mahomes recorded a third consecutive game with four passing touchdowns on 303 passing yards and one interception. During Monday Night Football against the Los Angeles Rams in week 11, Mahomes finished with 478 passing yards, six touchdowns, and three interceptions as the Chiefs lost 51–54. His 478 passing yards were the most for a single game by any quarterback for the 2018 season.

Following an 89-yard touchdown pass to wide receiver Demarcus Robinson in a week 17 game against the Oakland Raiders, Mahomes became the second quarterback in NFL history to throw for 5,000 yards and 50 touchdowns. Additionally, he became one of seven players in NFL history with 5,000 passing yards in a season. He finished second in passing yards to Ben Roethlisberger. He became the first Chief since Len Dawson in 1966 to lead the league in passing touchdowns. He helped lead the Chiefs to a 12–4 record and their third straight division title.

On January 12, 2019, the Chiefs defeated the Indianapolis Colts 31–13 in the Divisional Round, giving the Chiefs their first home playoff win since the 1993 season. Mahomes threw for 278 yards with no interceptions and rushed for one touchdown. The win allowed the Chiefs to host the first AFC Championship held at Arrowhead Stadium. Mahomes passed for 295 yards and three touchdowns, but the Chiefs lost to the New England Patriots in overtime 37–31.

Mahomes' performance for the season earned multiple awards. He was named to the 2019 Pro Bowl, he was named First Team All–Pro, 2019 Best NFL Player ESPY Award, and was named Kansas City Club 101 Awards AFC Offensive Player of the Year. He was also named the NFL MVP, the first winner for the Chiefs in franchise history. He was ranked as the fourth-best player by his peers on the NFL Top 100 Players of 2019.

2019 season

Playing against the Jacksonville Jaguars, Mahomes threw for 378 yards and three touchdowns despite star receiver Tyreek Hill's injury in the first quarter and Mahomes second quarter ankle sprain. In week 2 against the Oakland Raiders, Mahomes threw for 278 yards and four touchdowns in the second quarter alone, the most passing yards in any quarter since 2008. Mahomes finished the game with 443 yards, and was named AFC Offensive Player of the Week. For the second consecutive season, Mahomes was named AFC Offensive Player of the Month for September after leading the Chiefs to a 4–0 start (10 passing touchdowns with no interceptions). Mahomes dislocated his patella in week 7 against the Denver Broncos. The following day, an MRI revealed no significant structural damage. He was initially expected to miss at least three weeks. He returned two weeks later against the Tennessee Titans, throwing for 446 yards and three touchdowns, losing 35–32. Mahomes ran for a career-high 59 yards, but threw for a career-low (for games he finished) with 182 yards in the Chiefs' week 11 victory over the Chargers. In week 16 win over the Chicago Bears on Sunday Night Football, Mahomes celebrated by counting to 10 on his fingers, alluding to the fact that he was the 10th overall pick in the 2017 NFL Draft and that the Bears could have drafted him with the second pick instead of Mitchell Trubisky. He finished the season with 4,031 yards and 26 touchdowns with only five interceptions. He helped lead the Chiefs to their second consecutive 12–4 record and first round bye, as well as their fourth consecutive division title. He was selected to the 2020 Pro Bowl, though he did not play due to his participation in Super Bowl LIV.

In the Divisional Round against the Houston Texans, the Chiefs faced a 24–0 deficit early in the second quarter. The Chiefs then went on a 51–7 run, including 41 unanswered points, to win 51–31. Mahomes threw for 321 yards and five touchdowns and rushed for 53 yards. In their second AFC Championship, playing the Titans, Mahomes threw for three touchdowns and rushed for a 27-yard touchdown, the second longest run of his career and longest in the playoffs. He sparked a comeback from 17–7 in the second quarter to a 35–24 victory. The Chiefs made their first Super Bowl appearance since Super Bowl IV in 1970. In Super Bowl LIV, the Chiefs trailed 20–10 against the San Francisco 49ers in the fourth quarter with 8:53 remaining. It was their third straight game facing a 10+ point deficit. With just over 7 minutes to play, a successful 49ers challenge of a completed catch left the Chiefs facing 3rd and 15 on their own 35-yard-line. Mahomes asked his coaching staff to call the play Jet Chip Wasp, and successfully completed a deep pass to Tyreek Hill for 44 yards. This shifted momentum towards the Chiefs, who in the remaining minutes of the game went on a 21–0 run, securing their first Super Bowl victory in 50 years. Mahomes threw for 286 yards and two touchdowns and rushed for another 29 yards and one touchdown and was named Super Bowl MVP. He was the youngest quarterback and third-youngest player in NFL history to earn the award. He was ranked fourth by his fellow players on the NFL Top 100 Players of 2020.

2020 season

On April 30, 2020, the Chiefs picked up the fifth-year option on Mahomes's contract. On July 6, he signed a ten-year extension worth $477 million with another $26 million in potential bonuses for a total of $503 million. The contract extends through the 2031 season. The contract is currently the largest contract in American professional sports history, surpassing Mike Trout's 12-year, $426.5 million contract with the Los Angeles Angels. Mahomes became the first professional athlete to have a half-billion dollar contract. Soccer players Lionel Messi and Cristiano Ronaldo have since surpassed the contract amount.

In the Chiefs' week 2 win over the Los Angeles Chargers, Mahomes achieved his fourth fourth-quarter comeback. The Chiefs trailed 9–17 entering the fourth quarter before winning in overtime 23–20. The comeback was the NFL record sixth time he overcame a 10+ point deficit to win. In a week 3 win over the Baltimore Ravens he threw for 385 passing yards, passing for four touchdowns and rushing for one. In the game, he became the fastest quarterback to surpass 10,000 career yards. It took him 34 games to eclipse Kurt Warner's mark. He was named AFC Offensive Player of the Week. In week 8, he threw for 416 yards and five touchdowns in a 35–9 victory against the New York Jets. Mahomes was again named AFC Offensive Player of the Week. In a week 9 victory over the Carolina Panthers, he threw for 372 passing yards and four touchdowns. In week 12 against the Tampa Bay Buccaneers, Mahomes led the Chiefs to a 27–24 victory while throwing for 462 yards and three touchdowns. Mahomes was named AFC Offensive Player of the Month for November. In 2020, Sports Illustrated named him one of their Sportspeople of the Year for his activism following the murder of George Floyd and his encouragement for people to vote in the 2020 presidential election. In week 14, against the Miami Dolphins, he tied a career high with three interceptions. Mahomes rested for week 17 after the Chiefs locked up home-field advantage throughout the playoffs. Mahomes finished the 2020 season with 4,740 passing yards, 38 touchdowns and six interceptions. He was named to the Pro Bowl for his accomplishments in the 2020 season.

In the Divisional Round against the Cleveland Browns, Mahomes left the game in the third quarter after being tackled by Browns linebacker Mack Wilson. He was diagnosed with a concussion. Due to the concussion, per NFL rules, he was unable to return. The Chiefs would win the game 22–17, allowing the Chiefs to host a conference championship game for the NFL-record-tying third consecutive year, the other instance was during Andy Reid's tenure with the Philadelphia Eagles.

Later that week, he announced in a press conference that Mahomes had cleared concussion protocol, saying, "Everything has been good. I went through everything; three or four different doctors have said everything is looking good.'"

In the AFC Championship against the Buffalo Bills, Mahomes threw for 325 yards and three touchdown passes, while leading the Chiefs to a 38–24 victory and their second consecutive Super Bowl appearance. Mahomes became the youngest quarterback to start in three straight AFC Championships. In Super Bowl LV against the Tampa Bay Buccaneers, Mahomes threw for 270 yards and two interceptions in the game as the Chiefs lost 9–31. It was his first double-digit loss in the NFL, and also the first time since he became the Chiefs starting quarterback that the offense did not score any touchdowns. The Buccaneers defense used two deep safeties to neutralize Mahomes's wide receiver targets. The Chiefs' injury-ravaged offensive line was no match for the Buccaneers' pass rush defense, as Mahomes was pressured on a Super Bowl record 29 of 56 dropbacks while also being sacked three times and hit twice. Despite the pressure Mahomes still managed to throw several long accurate passes that were dropped by their intended targets resulting in incompletions; a highlight was late in the fourth quarter as Mahomes was being tripped he threw a pass that hit the facemask of receiver Darrel Williams.

Three days after the Super Bowl, Mahomes underwent surgery to repair a turf toe injury he suffered in the divisional round game against the Browns. He was named as the top-ranked player in the NFL by his peers on the NFL Top 100 Players of 2021.

2021 season

On March 12, 2021, Mahomes restructured his contract to save the Chiefs $17 million in salary cap space.

In week 1, Mahomes had three passing touchdowns, one rushing touchdown, and 337 yards in a 33–29 win over the Cleveland Browns, earning AFC Offensive Player of the Week. In the Chiefs week 2 loss to the Baltimore Ravens, he threw his first interception in the month of September of his career. The 36–35 setback marked Mahomes first loss in the month of September in his career. In a week 5 loss to the Buffalo Bills, Mahomes set career highs for rushing yards with 61 and passing attempts with 54. The 20–38 loss was only his second loss by double digits in his career and his first in the regular season. Two weeks later, the Chiefs lost to the Tennessee Titans 3–27. The Chiefs' three points were the fewest points a Mahomes-led team scored since he became the starter. It was his sixth consecutive game with an interception, the longest streak of his career. He had two fumbles in the second half which gave him the most turnovers he has had in a season only seven games into the season. In the Chiefs week 9 victory over the Green Bay Packers, Mahomes threw for 166 yards, which was a career low in games he finished. By not throwing an interception for the first time since week 1, he ended a career worst streak of six consecutive games throwing an interception. Mahomes bounced back the following week in a 41–14 victory over the Las Vegas Raiders, where he threw for 406 yards and five touchdowns, an NFL record-tying third game throwing for at least 400 yards and five touchdowns. He joined Pro Football Hall of Fame quarterbacks Joe Montana, Dan Marino, and Peyton Manning as quarterbacks that accomplished the feat. In the Chiefs' week 15 win over the Los Angeles Chargers, he threw for 410 yards and three touchdowns, including the game winning 34-yard touchdown pass in overtime to Travis Kelce. It was his seventh 400-yard game of his career. He finished the regular season with 4,839 yards, 37 touchdowns, 13 interceptions (a career high), and a 98.5 quarterback rating (a career low for a full season). The Chiefs finished the season 12–5, as well as securing their sixth consecutive AFC West title. He earned a Pro Bowl nomination for the 2021 season.

The Chiefs hosted the Pittsburgh Steelers in the Wild Card Round, the first time he participated at that stage of the playoffs. Mahomes threw for 404 yards, five touchdowns, and an interception in the 42–21 win. His 404 passing yards set a franchise record for passing yards in a playoff game. In the Divisional Round against the Buffalo Bills, Mahomes recorded 378 passing yards and three passing touchdowns to go along with 69 rushing yards and a rushing touchdown during the 42–36 overtime win. In the final seconds of regulation, Andy Reid gave Mahomes a motivational talk and told him to be "The Grim Reaper". After the two-minute warning and in overtime alone, he threw for 177 yards. The game was immediately regarded as one of the greatest playoff games of all time. In the AFC Championship Game against the Cincinnati Bengals, Mahomes threw for 275 yards and three touchdowns, but also threw two interceptions, including one in overtime in the 27–24 loss. He was ranked eighth by his fellow players on the NFL Top 100 Players of 2022.

2022 season

In week 1 against the Arizona Cardinals, Mahomes threw for 360 yards and five touchdowns in the Chiefs 44–21 victory, his sixth 5+ touchdown game. He also had a quarterback rating of 144.2, the 3rd highest of his career and his best since 2020. He was named AFC Offensive Player of the Week for his week 1 performance. In week 4, Mahomes threw for 249 yards and three touchdowns in a 41–31 win over the Tampa Bay Buccaneers, earning his second AFC Offensive Player of the Week honors of the season. In week 7 against the San Francisco 49ers, Mahomes threw for 423 yards and three touchdowns, his seventh career 400-yard game. In week 8 against the Tennessee Titans, Mahomes set single-game franchise records for pass completions (43) and pass attempts (68) in a single game. In that game, which was only his 71st career start, he broke the NFL record for passing  yards in a quarterback's first 75 career starts with 21,596. The following week, his 72nd start, he would break the record for passing touchdowns in a quarterback's first 75 starts with 176. Mahomes was named AFC Offensive Player of the Month for November. In the Chiefs week 15 game against the Houston Texans, Mahomes ran for his 12th career rushing touchdown setting a franchise record for rushing touchdowns by a quarterback. He was named to his fifth Pro Bowl for the season. Mahomes reached 5,000 passing yards on the season in a Week 17 win against the Denver Broncos for the second time in his career. He set the NFL record for most total yards in a season by a quarterback (combined passing and rushing) with 5,608. He also broke his own Chiefs' franchise record for passing yards in a season with 5,250.

With the number 1 seed in the AFC, the Chiefs earned a bye week in the first round of the playoffs. In the Chiefs' Divisional Round victory over the Jacksonville Jaguars, a high ankle sprain sidelined Mahomes for much of the first half, but he returned to the game in the second half helping lead the Chiefs to victory. In the AFC Championship game, the Chiefs defeated the Cincinnati Bengals, ending a three-game losing streak (including playoffs) to the team, to advance to their third Super Bowl in four seasons. Against the Philadelphia Eagles in Super Bowl LVII, Mahomes reaggravated his ankle late in the second quarter as the Chiefs went into halftime trailing by 10. However, Mahomes stayed in the game and led Kansas City to a touchdown on their first three drives of the second half, leading the Chiefs to a 38–35 win over the Eagles. He was awarded his second career Super Bowl MVP for his efforts. Mahomes also finished the season as the Most Valuable Player, and was the league leader in both passing yards and passing touchdowns, becoming the first player in NFL history to achieve all four feats in a season.

NFL career statistics

Regular season

Postseason

Super Bowl

Records

NFL records
 Consecutive 300-plus passing yard games: 8 (tied)
 Consecutive double digit deficits overcome including playoffs: 6
 Fastest to 10,000 career passing yards: 34 games
 Fastest to 15,000 career passing yards: 49 games
 Fastest to 20,000 career passing yards: 67 games
 Fastest to 100 career touchdowns: 40 games
 Career playoff passer rating (minimum 150 attempts): 107.4 
 Career passer rating (minimum 1,500 attempts): 105.7
 Career passing yards per game (minimum 1,500 attempts): 303.0
 Passing yards in a player's first 50 games: 15,348
 Passing touchdowns in a player's first 50 games: 125
 Passing touchdowns in a postseason: 11 (2021) (tied)
 Total touchdowns (passing and rushing) in a postseason: 12 (2019, 2021)
 Total yards (passing and rushing) in a season: 5,608 (2022)

Chiefs franchise records
 Touchdown passes in a game: 6 (2018, tied)
 Touchdown passes in a season: 50 (2018)
 Passing yards in a season: 5,250 (2022)
 Passing yards in a playoff game: 404 (2021–22 playoffs)
 Attempts in a game: 68 (2022)
 Completions in a game: 43 (2022)
 Career rushing touchdowns by a quarterback: 12

Awards and honors

NFL
 2× Super Bowl champion (LIV, LVII)
 2× Super Bowl MVP (LIV, LVII)
 2× NFL Most Valuable Player (2018, 2022)
 NFL Offensive Player of the Year (2018)
 2× First-team All-Pro (2018, 2022)
 Second-team All-Pro (2020)
 5× Pro Bowl (2018–2022)
 2× NFL passing touchdowns leader (2018, 2022)
 NFL passing yards leader (2022)
 Sports Illustrated Sportsperson of the Year (2020)
 Bert Bell Award (2018)

College
 Sammy Baugh Trophy (2016)
 Second-team All-Big 12 (2016)
 FBS passing yards leader (2016)

Personal life

Mahomes' father Pat is a former Major League Baseball pitcher. Mahomes is the godson of former Major League pitcher LaTroy Hawkins, who was his father's teammate on the Minnesota Twins. He has a younger brother, Jackson, who is a notable internet celebrity.

On September 1, 2020, Mahomes proposed to Brittany Matthews, his high school sweetheart, in a suite in Arrowhead Stadium, the day Mahomes received his Super Bowl LIV championship ring. Matthews had a brief professional soccer career playing for UMF Afturelding and then became a certified personal trainer. She is also a co-owner of the Kansas City Current, a women's professional soccer team. The couple married on March 12, 2022. They have two children: a daughter born in February 2021 and a son born in November 2022. The family resides in Kansas City, Missouri. 

Mahomes will be featured in the NFL Films and Netflix sports documentary series Quarterback, alongside other NFL quarterbacks Kirk Cousins and Marcus Mariota. All three players were filmed during the 2022 season on-and-off the field. The series will premiere in the middle of 2023. Mahomes' newly-established 2PM Productions will collaborate on producing the series.

Mahomes is a Christian. His mother said he found his faith when he was in middle school, where he was involved with a youth group at his church. Mahomes has said, "Faith is huge for me … Before every game, I walk the field and I do a prayer at the goalpost. I just thank God for those opportunities and I thank God for letting me be on a stage where I can glorify Him. The biggest thing that I pray for is that whatever happens, win or lose, success or failure, that I'm glorifying Him."

Mahomes plays golf during the offseason. He has participated in several celebrity tournaments, including the American Century Championship since 2020. He participated in the 2022 edition of The Match alongside Josh Allen losing to Tom Brady and Aaron Rodgers.

Endorsements
Following his 2018 MVP season, Mahomes received multiple endorsement deals. His first contract came from Hunt's upon revealing his love for ketchup. In addition, he signed endorsement deals with Oakley, Essentia Water, Hy-Vee, State Farm, DirectTV, Adidas, and Head & Shoulders. He also signed an endorsement contract with Helzberg Diamonds who released a line of necklaces featuring his logo. He was named the cover athlete for Madden NFL 20, becoming the first Chiefs player to be on the cover. He would be named the Madden cover athlete again, along with Tom Brady, two years later for Madden NFL 22. Mahomes and Brady are the first players to be named cover athlete twice. In 2020 he signed an endorsement deal with sports drink maker BioSteel sports drinks. He also became an equity partner in the company. On August 16, 2021, he announced he would be releasing his own signature shoe as part of his endorsement deal with Adidas. The shoe was called the Mahomes 1 Impact FLX and was released on August 23.

In 2022, Mahomes appeared in a commercial for Coors Light. NFL rules prohibit players from endorsing alcohol products, so the product in the commercial was a Coors flashlight instead of beer.

Philanthropy
In April 2019, Mahomes announced the establishment of a nonprofit organization called the 15 and the Mahomies Foundation. The nonprofit's website states that it is "dedicated to improving the lives of children".

Following the murder of George Floyd by police officer Derek Chauvin, Mahomes, along with teammate Tyrann Mathieu and several other NFL players, made a video encouraging the NFL to condemn police brutality and violence against black people and to admit it was wrong to silence Colin Kaepernick and Eric Reid for their protests during the playing of the National Anthem.

Mahomes and Mathieu started a voter registration project in Kansas City. The project encouraged residents to register to vote in the 2020 Presidential Election. He worked with the Chiefs to encourage players to vote. He joined LeBron James' Rock the Vote initiative to encourage people to register and vote.

Mahomes was named to Time 100's list of most influential people of 2020.

Business investments
In 2020, Mahomes joined the Kansas City Royals ownership group as a minority stakeholder. In 2021, he joined Sporting Club, the ownership group of the Major League Soccer franchise Sporting Kansas City. Mahomes is a member of an ownership group of an upcoming professional pickleball team based in Miami, Florida. The ownership group also includes Naomi Osaka, Nick Kyrgios, and Rich Paul. Mahomes joined the ownership group of the NWSL's Kansas City Current in 2023. His wife has been a member of the ownership group since the team was established.

In 2021, Mahomes became an investor in a group to expand the Whataburger fast food restaurant franchise to Missouri and Kansas. The locations will primarily be in the Kansas City metropolitan area and the Wichita, Kansas metropolitan area, and multiple locations in between the cities.

See also
 List of AP NFL MVP Award winners
 List of NCAA major college football yearly total offense leaders
 List of NFL quarterbacks with 5,000 passing yards in a season
 List of starting black NFL quarterbacks
 List of Super Bowl MVPs
 List of Super Bowl starting quarterbacks

Notes

References

External links

 
 
 Kansas City Chiefs bio
 Texas Tech football bio
 Texas Tech baseball bio
 Texas Tech baseball stats

1995 births
Living people
African-American baseball players
African-American Christians
African-American players of American football
American Conference Pro Bowl players
American football quarterbacks
American philanthropists
Baseball pitchers
Baseball players from Kansas City, Missouri
Baseball players from Texas
Christians from Texas
Kansas City Chiefs players
Kansas City Royals owners
Laureus World Sports Awards winners
National Football League Most Valuable Player Award winners
National Football League Offensive Player of the Year Award winners
People from Whitehouse, Texas
Players of American football from Kansas City, Missouri
Players of American football from Texas
Sportspeople from Tyler, Texas
Super Bowl MVPs
Texas Tech Red Raiders baseball players
Texas Tech Red Raiders football players